Erik Poulsen is an American politician.

Erik or Eric Poulsen may also refer to:

Erik Dyreborg, né Erik Poulsen
Eric Poulsen, skier in 1970 Alpine Skiing World Cup – Men's Giant Slalom
Erik Poulsen (Danish politician)

See also
Erik Pauelsen (1749-1790), Danish painter
Erik Paulsen, American politician
Erik Paulson, American mixed martial artist